The Restless Dead is the fifth novel in writer Simon Beckett's Doctor David Hunter crime series. It was first published in English in April 2017.

Plot
Dr Hunter is back working in London and at a low ebb professionally as he was the scapegoat for what went wrong in the last novel (The Calling of the Grave). When a call comes out of the blue from a Detective Inspector in Essex about recovering a body from some tidal mudflats, Hunter jumps at the chance to be working for the police again.

The body is thought to be that of a wealthy young man who went missing only Dr Hunter is not convinced and actually proves the body is not that of the missing man.

The setting is the coast of Essex with an estuary and its many inlets and narrow waterways. The bodies and the mysteries pile up with Hunter also getting too close to some of the major suspects and a possible resurgence of an old character at the end.

Publishing
Due to Simon Beckett's popularity in Germany, the book was published in German as Totenfang in October 2016 some 6 months before the United Kingdom release.

References

Dr David Hunter (series)
2017 British novels
Novels set in Essex
Bantam Books books